The 2019–20 Auburn Tigers women's basketball team represented Auburn University during the 2019–20 NCAA Division I women's basketball season. The Tigers, led by eighth-year head coach Terri Williams-Flournoy, played their home games at Auburn Arena and competed as members of the Southeastern Conference (SEC).

Preseason

SEC media poll
The SEC media poll was released on October 15, 2019.

Schedule

|-
!colspan=9 style=| Non-conference regular season

|-
!colspan=9 style=| SEC regular season

|-
!colspan=9 style=| SEC Tournament

References

Auburn Tigers women's basketball seasons
Auburn
Auburn Tigers
Auburn Tigers